The Volvo S70 is a compact executive car produced by Volvo Cars from 1996 to 2000. The S70 was essentially a facelifted 850 saloon. The S70 was replaced with the Volvo S60.

Overview
Introduced in Europe in late 1996 for the 1997 model year and later in the U.S. for the 1998 model year, the Volvo S70 was an updated version of the Volvo 850 saloon. The S70's body style was overall more rounded compared to its predecessor. Changes included a redesigned front end with new lights, fully colour-coded bumpers and side trim, and clear indicator lenses for the rear lights, as well as a redesigned interior. According to Volvo, a total of 1800 changes were made.

Standard equipment was improved with remote central locking, heated & electrically adjustable mirrors, 4 airbags, power brakes with ABS and power windows being standard on every car. Trim levels varied for each market as did the equipment levels of the most basic trims. In the United States, the badging denoted the engine variant and to some extent the equipment level, whereas in Europe engine and options could be chosen individually. On all markets more powerful versions usually received better or upgraded standard equipment. The T5 and R were the series high-performance models.

For model year 1999 a minor facelift was introduced. Apart from very minor cosmetic changes, such as a slightly different Volvo badge on the front grille and US models now being equipped with side markers on the front fenders, most changes were done to the mechanicals. Volvo introduced its second generation side airbag which increased in volume to offer better protection. WHIPS, Volvo's system to minimize whiplash injuries, was also introduced as part of the standard equipment. New engine management systems with drive-by-wire replaced the mechanical throttle on all turbo engines as well as bringing with them an upgraded traction control. Now including throttle as well as brake intervention it was renamed STC. The ABS was upgraded from a three-channel to a four-channel system, all-wheel drive models received thicker rear discs and redesigned rear calipers. All automatic transmissions were now equipped with adaptive shift-logic, replacing the previous 3-mode selection. A starter interlock was added to models with manual transmissions.

For model year 2000 a new 5-speed automatic transmission with adaptive shift-logic was introduced. It was only available on non turbo front-wheel drive models. The 10V engine variants were dropped and replaced by detuned 20V versions, drive-by-wire throttle was now also introduced for non turbo models.

Models

S70
With the S70, Volvo continued to offer a mid-size saloon. With a variety of models and options it was well received but was outsold by its estate variant the V70.
With engines choices ranging from 126PS to 250PS, and a diesel engine finally being available for the saloon as well as the Bi-Fuel, there was something for everyone. Market adjustments meant that outside of Europe no TDI or Bi-Fuel models were available.

Specialised versions for the fleet market, such as a taxi and police variant, were now available from the factory. Notable uses of police S70's were by some British highway patrol forces and even some North American police forces.

S70 AWD
From model year 1998 to 2000 a S70 AWD was offered. It used the same setup as the V70 AWD, with the exception of the rear self-leveling suspension being an option rather than a standard feature. The only available engine was the 193 PS 2.4 L turbo with either a 4-speed automatic or 5-speed manual transmission.

S70 R 
An S70 'R' version was introduced in 1997 for the 1998 model year and offered the highest performance of all S70 models. Only FWD versions were produced. The model was only available in Europe and few select other countries.

The S70 R came with a unique leather/Alcantara interior that featured diamond stitching on the seats. Further styling touches were a special front bumper, blue gauge faces for the instrument cluster, the option to have the car in a R specific colour and a choice of unique 16" or 17" alloy wheels. Standard equipment was substantially upgraded over normal models with few options available such as a trunk mounted CD-changer, RTI navigation system or an upgraded stereo system. Production ended with the 1998 model year.

Engines

 *Volvo used a modified version of the 2.5 TDI Audi engine
 **For 1999 the engine management system was updated to comply with emission regulations.

See also
Volvo 850, preceding model, largely a pre-facelift version
Volvo V70, estate version based on the same platform and bearing the same design
Volvo S40, compact model bearing a similar front end design

Notes

References

S70
Sedans
Mid-size cars
Compact executive cars
Euro NCAP large family cars
Front-wheel-drive vehicles
All-wheel-drive vehicles
Cars introduced in 1996
2000s cars

ja:ボルボ・V70